Amar Aponjon is a romantic drama film directed by Raja Chanda. The movie is a remake of the Tamil language film Autograph. The film stars Soham Chakraborty with Priyanka Sarkar as his school-day crush, Aindrita Ray as his college-life lover and Subhashree Ganguly as his emotional anchor in professional life.

Cast
Soham Chakraborty as Joydip
Subhashree Ganguly as Shree
Aindrita Ray as Sayoni
Priyanka Sarkar as Priya
Mimi Chakraborty as Mou
Siddartha Chatterjee
Kharaj Mukherjee
 Subhadra Mukherjee as Joydip's mother
Shantilal Mukherjee as Joydip's father

Production
Principal photography of the film started on 15 December 2016 in Kalimpong, Kolkata and Birbhum.  Revealing a bit about the film's plot, the director said, "It's about how a guy (Soham), who gets ditched in love, turns his life around by surrounding himself with positive people. He's associated with three women in the film, but how, I can't reveal that now," he said. Soham also debuted as a producer with this film, jointly producing the film with actor studio owned by Abhishake de sarkar and Ravi Keswani, under Ajosro Entertainment.

Soundtrack

Dabbu and Dolon Mainak composed the music of the film, with lyrics by Prasen and Raja Chanda.

References

External links
 

Bengali-language Indian films
2010s Bengali-language films
Films scored by Dabbu
Indian romantic drama films
Bengali remakes of Tamil films
Films directed by Raja Chanda